Professor David Lloyd   is a Dublin-born and educated chemist specialising in computer aided drug design, Vice Chancellor and President of the University of South Australia. He is the Chair of the Committee for Adelaide and Deputy Chair of Universities Australia and a past member of South Australia's Economic Development Board.

Career 
After graduating from Dublin City University with a PhD in Medicinal Organic Chemistry, Lloyd worked as a Post-Doctoral Research Fellow in Trinity College Dublin and later in the pharmaceutical industry for De Novo Pharmaceuticals in Cambridge.

He returned to academia in 2004 to Trinity College Dublin where he was a appointed as the Hitachi Lecturer in Advanced Computing. A specialist in computer-aided drug design, he led the commercialisation and patenting of research developed in his laboratory, Trinity's Molecular Design Group.

In 2007 he was appointed Dean and Vice President of Research, before becoming Bursar and Director of Strategic Innovation at Trinity College Dublin .

Lloyd was appointed as the inaugural Chair of the Irish Research Council.

He moved to Adelaide  to take up the position of Vice Chancellor and President of the University of South Australia in 2013 at 38 years old, becoming Australia's youngest Vice Chancellor.

He was appointed to the Economic Development Board of South Australia in 2014 and was also appointed Chair of the Australian Technology Network, a group of technology-focused Australian universities. 

In 2019 Lloyd was appointed Chair of the Committee for Adelaide.

In 2015, his contract at the University of South Australia was extended to 2022, it was later extended to 2027.

Lloyd has a Bachelor of Science (Honours) in Applied Chemistry and a PhD in Medicinal Organic Chemistry from Dublin City University. He additionally holds an MA (j.o.) from Trinity College Dublin, an honorary Professorship from Tianjin University and is a Fellow of the Royal Society of Chemistry and a Chartered Chemist.

A personal friend of the late Sir Terry Pratchett, he holds an Honorary Doctorate from the author's fictional Unseen University and has written about Pratchett's life and work in articles published by The Conversation.

In 2019 Lloyd was elected Fellow of the Australian Academy of Technological Sciences and Engineering (FTSE).

References 

Living people
Irish scientists
Vice Chancellors of the University of South Australia
1974 births
University leaders
Fellows of the Australian Academy of Technological Sciences and Engineering